BirdWatch Ireland (BWI) is a voluntary conservation organisation devoted to the conservation and protection of wild birds and their habitats in Ireland. It was formerly known as the Irish Wildbird Conservancy (IWC). Irish Wildbird Conservancy was founded in 1968, among others by Major Robert (Robin) Ruttledge, an Irish ornithologist who became its first president.

BWI has over 15,000 active members and supporters, and a network of 30 branches actively promoting the importance of birds and habitats, and general conservation issues. It publishes the annual journal Irish Birds and the quarterly magazine Wings.  It manages a number of nature reserves including Little Skellig.

BirdWatch Ireland is a member of the Irish Environmental Network, the Sustainable Water Network (SWAN), Environmental (Ecological) NGOs Core Funding Ltd (EENGO), Working and Educating for Biodiversity (WEB) and the Irish Uplands Forum (IUF). They also work closely with the Irish National Biodiversity Data Centre in providing wildlife monitoring data.

The Charities Regulator reported in November 2022 that there had been misuse of funds and inadequate internal controls.

BirdTrack 

BirdTrack is an online citizen science website, operated by the British Trust for Ornithology (BTO) on behalf of a partnership of the BTO, the RSPB, BirdWatch Ireland, the Scottish Ornithologists' Club and the Welsh Ornithological Society.

Garden Bird Survey 

The Garden Bird Survey (GBS) is one of BirdWatch Ireland's most popular volunteer surveys which receives over 1,000 submissions annually when it takes place between December and February.

Report on declining Irish bird populations
The organization released the Irish Wetland Bird Survey in the 1990s, when there were 1.2 million wintering waterbirds in Ireland. A recent analysis in April 2019 put the number at 760,000.

In July 2019, Birdwatch Ireland reported that the Irish bird population was in "dramatic" decline, with 40 percent of the country's waterbirds, or half a million, lost in the prior 20 years. Loss of habitat was cited as the reason for the decline. Other reasons were climate changes, agriculture, hedge cutting, pollution, and the burning of scrub. Birdwatch Ireland called for Citizens' Assembly to examine the biodiversity loss. One of every five Irish bird species assessed in the survey was threatened with extinction. Lapwing numbers, according to Birdwatch Ireland, were down 67% in twenty years. It also said there had been an "almost complete extermination" of farmland birds, for example the corncrake. The curlew was reported on the verge of extinction in Ireland, with only 150 pairs remaining. In the 1960s, 5,000 pairs had been reported.

Reserves Managed by BirdWatch Ireland 
 East Coast Nature Reserve, Co. Wicklow
 Kilcoole, Co. Wicklow
 Wexford Wildfowl Reserve, Co. Wexford
 Capel Island & Knockadoon Head, Co. Cork
 Cuskinny Marsh, Co. Cork
 Sheskinmore Lough, Co. Donegal
 Rogerstown, Co. Dublin
 Shenick Island, Co. Dublin
 Bullock Island, Co. Offaly
 Bishop's Island, Co. Galway
 Small Wood, Co Galway
 Little Skellig, Co. Kerry
 Puffin Island, Co. Kerry
 Illaunmaistir, Co. Mayo
 Termoncarragh Lake, Co. Mayo
 Termoncarragh Meadows, Co. Mayo
 Annagh Marsh, Co. Mayo

References

External links
BWI Home Page 

Environmental organisations based in Ireland
Ornithological organizations
Bird conservation organizations
Animal welfare organisations based in the Republic of Ireland